The Summit Plantation House is an historic building in Adams Run, South Carolina, USA. The house was built for William and Amarinthia Wilkinson in 1819. The house was listed in the National Register on July 28, 1983.

References

External links

Historic American Buildings Survey in South Carolina
National Register of Historic Places in Charleston County, South Carolina
Houses in Charleston County, South Carolina
Houses on the National Register of Historic Places in South Carolina
Tabby buildings